Daddy's Home is the sixth album by rapper Sir Mix-a-Lot. The album was released in 2003 for Rhyme Cartel and was his first album since 1996's Return of the Bumpasaurus.

Track listing
All tracks by Sir Mix-a-Lot

"Daddy's Home" - 4:09 
"Big Screen" - 3:38 
"Game Don't Get Old" - 4:25
"Big Johnson" - 3:51 
"Till da Sun Cums Up" - 3:27 
"Y'all Don't Know" - 3:35 
"2 Horse" - 3:16 
"Auction for Tricks" - 1:52 
"Candy" - 3:25 
"At the Next Show" - 3:22 
"Nasty Girl" - 3:19 
"Party Ova Here" - 3:40 
"Big Ho" - 3:51 
"Resonate" - 3:09 
"Poppi Grande" - 4:05

Personnel 

Dean Buckley – Design
 E-Dawg – Vocals, Producer
Adam Ebel – Guitar (Electric), Producer
Ricardo Frazer – Executive Producer
Humptie – Vocals
Amylia Leston – Vocals
Gina Loya – Vocals
Outtasite – Vocals, Producer
Victoria Renhard – Photography
Sir Mix-A-Lot – Arranger, Programming, Vocals, Producer, Engineer, Executive Producer, Mixing
Strange – Producer, Engineer
Scott Tanner – Producer
Tiger Tanner – Vocals
Tomeka Williams – Vocals

References

Sir Mix-a-Lot albums
2003 albums